Demoniak  is the debut mixtape of French trap duo PSO Thug (made up of Aero and Leto), released on May 20, 2016.

Track listing
"Demoniak" (2:32)
"Cauchemar" (3:36)
"Règles du jeu" (3:41)
"Autour de moi" (3:12)
"Juste après" (3:49)
"Thuggin" (2:52)
"LGL" (3:43)
"Plein les poches" (4:21) (featuring Sadek)
"Le magot" (2:35)
"Après ce ca$h" (featuring Hayce Lemsi) (4:38)
"Tous les jours" (2:43)
"Bless" (4:55) (featuring XV Barbar & KranMax)
"Numéro uno" (2:20)

Charts

References

2016 mixtape albums
French-language albums